POP is the eleventh studio album released by Joachim Witt in 2004.

Track listing 

 Krieger des Lichts  "Warrior of light"  - 3:26
 Fluch der Liebe  "Curse of love"  - 3:29
 Für den Moment  "For the moment"  - 3:51
 Ich will mehr  "I want more"  - 4:00
 Du wirst bald Geschichte sein  "You will soon be history"  - 3:45
 Mein Freund der Baum  "My friend the tree"  - 3:32
 Später  "Later"  - 4:08
 Vorwärts  "Forward"  - 4:09
 Sag was du willst  "Say what you want"  - 3:45
 Erst wenn das Herz nicht mehr aus Stein ist  "Only when the heart is no longer made of stone"  - 4:04
 Draußen vor der Tür  "Outside the door"  - 4:02
 Immer noch  "Still"  - 4:25
 You Make Me Wonder - 6:34
 Zeit zu gehen *US Edition Bonus Track*  "Time to go"  - 3:28
 Erst wenn das Herz nicht mehr aus Stein ist (Club Remix) *US Edition Bonus Track - 5:04

2004 albums
Joachim Witt albums